Stathmopoda skelloni, the yellow featherfoot, is a species of moth in the Stathmopodidae family.  It is endemic to New Zealand and can be found throughout the country. This species inhabits native forest, coastal dunes and shrubland as well as cultivated gardens and orchards. The larvae of this species feed on a variety of plant species including agricultural crops such as kiwifruit and persimmons. The adult moths are on the wing from September until March and are nocturnal but are attracted to light.

Taxonomy 
This species was first described by Arthur Gardiner Butler in 1880 and named Boocara skelloni. Butler named this species in honour of William Skellon who had sent various specimens he had collected in Blenheim to Butler. In 1889 Edward Meyrick placed this species within the genus Stathmopoda. In 1921 Meyrick synonymised Stathmopoda fusilis with Stathmopoda phlegyra, which in turn was synonymsied by J. S. Dugdale in 1988 with this species. The female holotype specimen, collected in Blenheim, is held at the Natural History Museum, London. The common name for this species is the yellow featherfoot.

The name skelloni was previously incorrectly used for S. horticola, a similar looking species which can be distinguished by the more extensive markings on the forewing of that species.

Description 

Meyrick described this species as follows:

Distribution 
This species is endemic to New Zealand and can be found throughout New Zealand including in Taranaki, Wellington, Blenheim, Nelson, Christchurch, Dunedin, Lake Wakatipu and Invercargill.

Habitat and hosts 

S. skelloni is found in a variety of habitats including native forest, coastal dunes, shrubland as well as cultivated gardens and orchards. The larvae of this species feed on a variety of native and introduced plants including dried gorse flowers, seeds and flowers of flax species, raupō seeds as well as fruits of lemonwood. Larvae have been reared from dead and dying bracts, flowers, leaves and buds of kiwifruit,  old flowers and seeds of Calystegia tuguriorum, the seedpods of Phormium tenax and from flowers of species in the genus Senecio.

Behaviour 
Adults are on the wing from September until March. They are a nocturnal species and are attracted to light. This species is similar to other species in its family in that at rest it holds its hind legs outside of its wings. In this posture only the feet of its hind legs touch the ground.

Interaction with humans
This species is a known pest of agricultural crops produced in New Zealand such as kiwifruit and persimmons. Although found to be less frequently observed than S. horticola, S. skelloni is still regarded as an agricultural pest as its larvae are more likely to cause fruit damage compared to other agricultural pest moth species.

References

Moths described in 1880
Stathmopodidae
Moths of New Zealand
Endemic fauna of New Zealand
Taxa named by Arthur Gardiner Butler
Endemic moths of New Zealand